The Luxembourg Socialist Workers' Party, abbreviated to LSAP or POSL, is a social-democratic, pro-European political party in Luxembourg.

The LSAP is the third-largest party in the Chamber of Deputies, having won 10 of 60 seats at the 2018 general election, and has one seat in the European Parliament. The LSAP is currently part of the Bettel–Schneider government, with Etienne Schneider of the LSAP serving as Deputy Prime Minister. Since January 2022, the party's interim President has been Dan Biancalana.

The party is close to the Confederation of Independent Trade Unions, the country's largest trade union centre, but they have no formal links. The LSAP is particularly strong in the south of the country, controlling most of the mayoralties in the large towns of the Red Lands.  It is affiliated with the Socialist International, the Progressive Alliance, and the Party of European Socialists.

History
The party was formed on 5 July 1902 as the Social Democratic Party. Left-wing elements split in 1905 to create the Social Democratic Workers' Party. These were both re-united in 1912. In 1916, the party was renamed to 'Socialist Party', part of the Second International.

On 2 January 1921, communist elements split to create the Communist Party of Luxembourg. The Socialist Party was renamed the "Luxembourg Workers' Party" in 1924, and was a member of the Labour and Socialist International between 1923 and 1940. On 5 November 1937, the Party joined the government for the first time, in a coalition under Prime Minister Pierre Dupong.

Post-war
The party was reformed after the Second World War as the 'Luxembourg Socialist Workers' Party', in the mould of the Labour Party in the United Kingdom, where the government had been exiled.  In the first election after the war, in 1945, the LSAP was the big loser, falling to 26% of the vote, but remained in the National Union Government, along with all other parties. In 1947, the party started its process of re-building itself, and it managed to join a coalition government (1951-1959 in the Dupong-Bodson and Bech Bodson governments, and 1964–1968 in the Werner-Cravatte government). The discussions over the party's direction split the LSAP again. On 2 May 1970, Henry Cravatte was ejected as President by a trades union-led coup. In March 1971, centrist elements, led by Cravatte, split to create the Social Democratic Party. Those who left included 6 Deputies and most of the party leadership.

However, the LSAP could recover by 1974 and joined the DP in a centre-left coalition (the Thorn-Vouel-Berg government), which enacted important social reforms: judicial system reforms (including a humanisation of the penal system), introduction of a fifth week of holiday, general introduction of the 40-hour week, the salary index, reform of unemployment benefits. This did not prevent an electoral defeat in 1979. In this legislative period, the LSAP held their famous energy conference, and decided a moratorium for the atomic power station of Remerschen. This was the definitive end of project.

In 1984, the LSAP were re-united with most of the Social Democratic Party (some members joined the Christian Social People's Party).

Recent history
Following the 2004 general election, the LSAP served in the government of Luxembourg as junior partner to the Christian Social People's Party (CSV) under Prime Minister Jean-Claude Juncker in the first Juncker–Asselborn government, with the LSAP's Jean Asselborn serving as Deputy Prime Minister and Minister for Foreign Affairs. The coalition with the CSV continued as the second Juncker–Asselborn government following the 2009 general election, which lasted until July 2013 when the LSAP withdrew its support from the government, necessitating early elections.

Following the 2013 general election, the LSAP has been in a three-party Bettel–Schneider government with the Democratic Party and The Greens, with the Democratic Party's Xavier Bettel serving as Prime Minister and Etienne Schneider of the LSAP as Deputy Prime Minister.

Election results

Chamber of Deputies

European Parliament

Presidents

The formal leader of the party is the president.  However, often, a government minister will be the most important member of the party, as Jean Asselborn is now.  Below is a list of presidents of the Luxembourg Socialist Workers' Party since 1945.

 Michel Rasquin (1945–1951)
 Paul Wilwertz (1951–1952)
 Albert Bousser (1952–1954)
 Émile Ludwig (1954–1955)
 Paul Wilwertz (1955–1959)
 Henry Cravatte (1959–1970)
 Antoine Wehenkel (1970–1974)
 Lydie Schmit (1974–1980)
 Robert Krieps (1980–1985)
 Ben Fayot (1985–1997)
 Jean Asselborn (1997–2004)
 Alex Bodry (2004–2014)
 Claude Haagen (2014–2019)
 Franz Fayot (2019–2020)
 Yves Cruchten (2020–present)

Footnotes

References

External links

  

 
Social democratic parties
Full member parties of the Socialist International
Party of European Socialists member parties
Second International
Members of the Labour and Socialist International
Progressive Alliance
Parties represented in the European Parliament
1945 establishments in Luxembourg
Political parties established in 1945